The thimble jellyfish (Linuche unguiculata) is a species of cnidarian found in the warm West Atlantic Ocean, including the Caribbean. It is a tiny jellyfish with a straight-sided, flat-topped bell.
This jellyfish is the most common cause of seabather's eruption, a reaction caused by the injection of juvenile jellyfish nematocysts into human skin.

Description
The medusa of the thimble jellyfish has straight sides with sixteen grooves, and a flat top. The coronal groove between the top and sides provides flexibility. The margin of the bell has sixteen lappets (folds), the niches between these bearing alternately rhopalia (sense organs) and short tentacles (eight of each). There is no marginal ring canal. Symbiotic zooxanthellae give the bell an overall orangish-brown colour and the translucent mesoglea has dark flecks.

Distribution and habitat
The thimble jellyfish is found in the tropical and subtropical western Atlantic Ocean, particularly around the West Indies and the Bahamas. Its presence in any particular location is related to such factors as the presence of prey, temperature, salinity and oxygen saturation of the water.

Ecology
The thimble jellyfish swims constantly by pulsating its bell, rotating as it moves. It forms swarms in warm seas near the surface of the water. Aggregations have been reported covering a million square metres . The jellyfish feeds on plankton, drawing a water current past its outstretched tentacles by pulsating the bell. When edible zooplankton are encountered, they are immobilised by the cnidocytes (stinging cells) and passed by the tentacles to the mouth on the underside of the bell. Thimble jellyfish are consumed by fish, sea turtles and other predators.

Seabather's eruption
Larvae of the thimble jellyfish are the most common cause of seabather's eruption in the Caribbean and the Gulf of Mexico. The condition occurs when a swimmer comes in contact with a cloud of larvae, which stick to the swimmer's clothing and hair. When the swimmer exits the water and either bathes or drys out, the larvae are killed and in the process discharge their under-developed stinging cells. The stings are not painful, but can cause an itchy rash to form. In Florida, most cases occur between March and August. A similar condition occurs on the east coast of North America after exposure to the larvae of the sea anemone Edwardsiella lineata.

References 

Linuchidae
Animals described in 1788